The Museum of Musical Instruments of Milan exhibits over 700 musical instruments from the fifteenth to twentieth centuries with particular attention to Lombard instruments. The collection contains plucked instruments, Lombard and Cremonese violins, hunting horns, numerous wood instruments (e.g. flutes, oboes, clarinets, English horns), bassoons, pianos and some ancient organs. In particular the Cremonese lutherie (from Cremona in low Lombardy) is appreciated all over the world for the high quality of its musical instruments. The museum also displays the equipment of the former Studio di fonologia musicale di Radio Milano.

In 2000 a donation by the  added 79 musical instruments, made between the 18th and 20th century, to the civic collection; they had been collected by the Monzino family. These musical instruments represent the strong tradition of Lombard lutherie.

The museum is situated in the Sforza Castle complex that also includes The Museum of Ancient Art, the Pinacotheca, the Applied Arts Collection and  the Egyptian Museum (that includes the prehistoric sections of the Archaeological Museum of Milan).

Gallery

See also 
 List of music museums

References
Le città d'arte:Milano, Guide brevi Skira, ed.2008, eutori vari
Milano e provincia, Touring Club Italiano ed.2003, autori vari
https://web.archive.org/web/20131111124406/http://www.comune.milano.it/dseserver/webcity/documenti.nsf/0/5A4CA30F4FDC7CA8C125726C005484BE?opendocument
COLLECTIONS OF APPLIED ARTS AND THE MUSEUM OF MUSICAL INSTRUMENTS ON THE FIRST AND SECOND FLOORS OF THE ROCCHETTA
https://archive.today/20130218110516/http://www.ufficiostampa.rai.it/comunicati_aziendali/20120614/rai__lo_studio_di_fonologia_torna_a__suonare_.html

External links

Museums in Milan
Musical instrument museums in Italy
Sforza Castle
Music museums in Italy
Tourist attractions in Milan